The 2011–12 Fairfield Stags men's basketball team represented Fairfield University during the 2011–12 NCAA Division I men's basketball season. The Stags, led by first year head coach Sydney Johnson, played their home games at Webster Bank Arena, with games during the CIT played at Alumni Hall, and are members of the Metro Atlantic Athletic Conference. They finished the season 22–15, 12–6 in MAAC play to finish in a tie for third place. They lost in the semifinals of the MAAC Basketball tournament to Iona. They were invited to the 2012 CollegeInsider.com Tournament where they defeated Yale, Manhattan, and Robert Morris en route to the semifinals where they fell to Mercer.

Roster

Schedule

|-
!colspan=9 style=|Exhibition

|-
!colspan=9 style=|Regular season

|-
!colspan=9 style=| MAAC tournament

|-
!colspan=9 style=| CollegeInsider.com tournament

References

Fairfield Stags men's basketball seasons
Fairfield
Fairfield
Fairfield Stags
Fairfield Stags